Berezovik is a rural locality (a village) in Voskresenskoye Rural Settlement, Cherepovetsky District, Vologda Oblast, Russia. The population was 21 as of 2002.

Geography 
Vysokoye is the nearest rural locality.

References 

Rural localities in Cherepovetsky District